Agonum gracilipes is a species of ground beetle in the Platyninae subfamily. It is found everywhere in Europe except for Andorra, Monaco, Portugal, San Marino, Spain, Vatican City and various European islands.

References

Beetles described in 1812
gracilipes
Beetles of Europe